Stefano D'Amico (born February 3, 1996, in Turin) is an Italian composer. He composes neoclassical music and minimal music.

Biography 
Stefano D'Amico was born in Turin in 1996. At the age of 6 he moved to Cisternino, a small town in Apulia by the sea. He started studying piano when he was 11 and only a year later he entered ‘N. Rota’ Conservatoire, in Monopoli. He continued his studies with Francesco Buccarella. Some months later he wrote his first piano composition ‘Ora che noi’, which was performed at the year-end show and much appreciated. He then wrote other melodies which made him known to other musicians. In 2011 he became the keyboardist of an Apulian band with which he started to perform live and won a competition for new groups. At the beginning of 2020, while composing 'Luce soffusa', he came up with the idea of the album 'Tribute to the Earth'. it wants to pay homage to the beauty of our planet, and raise awareness on important issues such as pollution and climate change.
Stefano is indeed a convinced environmentalist and since 2018 he has taken part into social campaigns to help sensitize people to environmental issues.
As he declared, Philip Glass has been his biggest inspiration since his early studies.
In March 2021, he has signed with Believe Digital

Discography

Singles

 I will not lose you (2015)
 Rain (2017)
 Liebe (2019)
 Revival (2020) 
 April (2021)
 Stay here (2022)

Studio albums
 Tribute to the Earth (2020)

References

External links
 Stefano D'Amico website

Italian pianists
Italian classical composers
1996 births
Living people